Haludaria afasciata is a species of cyprinid fish found in Asia.

References 

Haludaria

Fish described in 1990